Darkspell is a novel by Katharine Kerr published in 1987.

Characters

Synopsis
Rhodry is sent into exile by his brother Rhys, the Gwerbret of Aberwyn, and becomes a mercenary soldier called a “silver dagger.” Jill goes with him; they become involved in a dark dweomerman’s plot to steal the Great Stone of the West, a magical gemstone which guides the conscience of Deverry’s king.

Reception
Dave Langford reviewed Darkspell for White Dwarf #99, and stated that "if the language is fake-Celtic, why the Old English? (To give a warm glow to D&D fans, I suppose.) I lost heart at this point."

Reviews
Review by Faren Miller (1987) in Locus, #320 September 1987
Review by Sue Thomason (1988) in Vector 144
Review by Nik Morton (1989) in Paperback Inferno, #81
Review? [German] by Gatita Kirchweger (2001) in Future Magic, Januar 2001

References

See also

 Deverry

Deverry Cycle
Fantasy novel series